De Schoolmeester is a smock mill in Westzaan, Netherlands which is maintained in full working order. It is the only wind powered paper mill in the world. The mill is listed as Rijksmonument number 40013.

History

The first paper mill in the Zaan region was built in 1605. De Schoolmeester was built in 1692. It is also known by the nickname De Gauwdief. The name De Schoolmeester (English: The Schoolmaster) probably denotes the occupation of one of the founders. The mill originally made grey paper. In 1778, the mill was powering two Hollander beaters. In 1852, the mill was bought by Gerbrand de Jong, who owned another wind-powered paper mill, De Kaarsenmaker at Zaandijk. He bought another nearby paper mill, De Vergulde Bijenkorf in 1854. In 1871, the mills were owned by Gebroeders de Jong, who demolished De Kaarsenmaker in the autumn of 1873. In 1877, the mill was modernised and a steam engine installed as auxiliary power. This meant that the mill was uninsureable against fire. In 1902, the nearby De Vergulde Bijenkorf burnt down. A steam driven paper factory was erected to replace it. This factory was able to make white paper. A fire started at De Schoolmeester in 1915 but was extinguished. In 1948, the steam engine was replaced by a Ford gas engine. They were rebuilt shorter than they had been previously. On 28 August 1957, De Schoolmeester was sold to Vereniging van Nederlandsche Papierfabrikanten by the de Jongs. In 1964, the gas engine was replaced by a Bernard diesel engine. In 1977, the mill was bought by Vereniging Zaansche Molens. The diesel engine was replaced by an electric motor in 1979. A four-year restoration of the mill at a cost of €450,000 was completed in June 2002. The work included complete renewal of the drying sheds.

The number of times the sails revolved in recent years is recorded as:-

{| class="wikitable" border="1"
|-
! Year
! Revolutions
|-
| 2002
| 558,000
|-
| 2003
| 435,115
|-
| 2004
| 649,896
|-
| 2005
| 589,336
|-
| 2006
| 560,379
|-
| 2007
| 630,406
|-
| 2008
| 537,498
|}

Description

De Schoolmeester is a six-sided smock mill with a stage, built on a two-storey base. The mill itself is at the centre of a long range of drying sheds of green painted weatherboard under a pantile roof. The mill and cap are thatched with reeds. The cap is winded by a tailpole and winch. The four common sails drive the various items of paper making machinery. There are three Hollander beaters. The sails on the inner stock span  and the sails on the outer stock span . They are carried on a cast-iron windshaft which was cast by Leiden millwrights D A Schrettlen & Co in 1860.

Papermakers

Gerbrand de Jong (1852–71)
Gebroeders de Jong (1871-1952)
W Kat (1859-1929)
Cees Kruidenburg (1895-1955)
Vereniging van Nederlandsche Papierfabrikanten (1952–77)
Vereniging De Zaansche Molen (since 1977)

Reference for above:-

Public access

De Schoolmeester is open from 10:00 to 16:00, Monday to Friday, and at other times by appointment.

References

External links
 The School Teacher at De Zaansche molen

Smock mills in the Netherlands
Windmills completed in 1692
Windmills in North Holland
Pulp and paper mills in the Netherlands
Rijksmonuments in North Holland
Hexagonal buildings
1692 establishments in the Dutch Republic